Ferdinand James M. Kingsley (born 13 February 1988) is a British actor. He is known for portraying the roles of Hamza Bey in the film Dracula Untold (2014), Mr. Francatelli in the television series Victoria (2016–2019), Irving Thalberg in the film Mank (2020), and Hob Gadling in Netflix's adaptation of The Sandman (2022).

Early life
Ferdinand James M. Kingsley was born on 13 February 1988 in Leamington Spa, Warwickshire, the son of actor Ben Kingsley and theatre director Alison Sutcliffe. He is of predominantly English descent; his paternal grandfather was of Khoja Gujarati descent and one of his great-grandfathers was believed by the family to have been of either German-Jewish or Russian-Jewish descent.

Kingsley attended Warwick School and the Guildhall School of Music and Drama.

Acting career
Kingsley's theatre credits include Troilus and Cressida, and Little Eyolf for the Royal Shakespeare Company. He played Rosencrantz in the National Theatre's 2010–11 production of Hamlet, for which he received a commendation at the 2010 Ian Charleson Awards, and Phaeax in Welcome to Thebes.

In the film The Last Legion he played Young Ambrosinus in flashbacks to the younger days of the character Ambrosinus, played by his father Ben Kingsley. He took the part of Albert Aurier in the BBC production Vincent Van Gogh: Painted With Words. He plays Bushy in Richard II, which is part of the BBC's Shakespeare season to be aired in Summer 2012.

He played both Jesus and God the Father in the August 2012 production of the York Mystery Plays. In 2013, Kingsley played the part of murdered Jewish anarchist Joshua Bloom in the BBC period crime drama Ripper Street, and filmed prominent roles in Agatha Christie's Poirot: Elephants Can Remember, the BBC feature film The Whale as Obed Hendricks, and Universal Pictures' 2014 feature Dracula Untold as Hamza Bey. In Spring 2013, Kingsley starred in the short film Dance in Colour by The Crookes. In 2016, Kingsley starred in ITV's drama Victoria as Italian British cook Charles Elmé Francatelli.

In 2022, Kingsley featured in the Netflix series The Sandman as Hob Gadling in episode 6, "The Sound of Her Wings".

Kingsley will portray George Wilkins in the upcoming Apple TV+ series Silo''.

Filmography

Film

Television

References

External links
 
 Conway VanGelder Grant - Ferdinand Kingsley/
 Instagram - Ferdinand Kingsley 
  Agent's Website 
 Ferdinand Kingsley on Twitter

1988 births
Living people
21st-century English male actors
Alumni of the Guildhall School of Music and Drama
English electronic musicians
English male film actors
English male stage actors
English male television actors
English people of Gujarati descent
English people of Indian descent
English people of Russian-Jewish descent
Male actors from Warwickshire
People from Leamington Spa